Lewis Jacqueline Brownstein is a historian, author, and professor along with being the former Chair of the Political Science and International Relations Department at SUNY New Paltz.  His main speciality of expertise is on the region of the Middle East more specifically but not limited to the Israeli/Palestinian conflict. Lew Brownstein earned his Ph.D. from the School for Advanced International Studies at Johns Hopkins University in 1969.  One of his biggest accomplishments besides his work published are the lectures he gives on a wide range of topics involving international affairs in various areas around the world. Lew Brownstein was born on October 1, 1938, in New York to Frances and Isidore Brownstein. Lew Brownstein is of Ashkenazi Jewish ancestry through his Russian Jewish paternal grandfather Harry Brownstein.

References

Living people
Year of birth missing (living people)
State University of New York at New Paltz faculty
Paul H. Nitze School of Advanced International Studies alumni
American historians
Historians of the Middle East
Jewish American historians
21st-century American Jews
American Ashkenazi Jews
American people of Russian-Jewish descent